The women's 4 × 400 metres relay competition at the 2016 Summer Olympics in Rio de Janeiro, Brazil was held at the Estádio Olímpico João Havelange on 19–20 August.

Summary
The United States entered as the defending Olympic champions while Jamaica was the reigning world champions from 2015, having defeated the Americans there. Great Britain entered with the fastest time recorded that year (3:25.05 minutes), which it had achieved to win the 2016 European title. France and Canada were the next strongest entries.

In the final, Stephenie Ann McPherson of Jamaica went out hard from the gun, chipping into the huge 3-turn stagger gap. By the end of the second turn she was almost side-by-side with American Courtney Okolo. Down the home stretch, Okolo accelerated and pulled away from McPherson. The USA exchanged first, followed closely by Jamaica.  Already with a gap back to Eilidh Doyle, Great Britain and Canada were the next to exchange.  American Natasha Hastings was first to the break and Anneisha McLaughlin-Whilby dropped in about 5 meters behind.  Anyika Onuora was more than ten meters behind Jamaica by the time the British broke. Canada was next and a rush around the turn by Patrycja Wyciszkiewicz dropped Poland in closely behind.  Through the turn McLaughlin-Whilby progressively closed the gap on Hastings, while the rest of the field fell another ten meters behind the leaders.  Onuora slowed further on the home stretch, with Canada's Alicia Brown passing her on the outside and Wyciszkiewicz pulling up on her shoulder.

The USA exchanged first, though with only a 2-meter lead on Jamaica.  Seconds later Canada was the next to exchange over Poland with Iga Baumgart running into the back of Brown, losing a step to dance away.  Up front, USA's Phyllis Francis again opened up a gap on Jamaica's Shericka Jackson around the turn.  She held the gap to the half way mark, then Jackson began to close it down.  Behind them, Caitlin Sargent-Jones brought Australia around Great Britain and past Poland.  After getting passed, Britain's Emily Diamond sparked up and passed both Poland and Australia, setting her marks on Canada's Noelle Montcalm, 5 meters ahead.  Coming into the handoff, the bronze medalist Jackson closed down to within a meter of Francis.  40 meters back, Diamond had gotten past Canada.  Sargent-Jones' exuberance brought Australia into the handoff last.

At the 2015 World Championships, Novlene Williams-Mills ran past Francena McCorory to give Jamaica the victory over the US, wasting Allyson Felix's incredible 47.7 leg leading up to the handoff, the second fastest in history.  In this race, the veteran Williams-Mills, at 34 the oldest woman in this race, was matched directly against Felix.  And well behind them, Britain's hopes were in the hands of their veteran Christine Ohuruogu.  All the way down the backstretch, Williams-Mills kept closing the gap, inching closer to Felix.  By the middle of the final turn, it looked like Williams-Mills was about to move into the perfect position to pass Felix coming off the turn.  Instead, Felix started to accelerate, the gap began to open wider.  From less than a meter, Felix continued to run away, opening up to 8 meters by the finish for a clear American victory.  Well behind them, in the battle for bronze, Olha Zemlyak came from seventh place to run Ukraine past Poland, Italy and Canada to get right behind Ohuruogu, but Ohuruogu stood firm through the final turn.  As Zemlyak moved to Ohuruogu's shoulder to attack coming off the turn, instead Canada's Sage Watson went around Zemlyak and Ohuruogu ran away, opening up a four-metre gap to take bronze for Britain.

The gold medal was Felix's sixth Olympic gold medal and also the ninth overall Olympic medal of her career, tying her with Merlene Ottey as the most decorated woman in track and field history. Ottey, however, never won Olympic gold. Furthermore, the gold medal was the sixth straight Olympic victory for the United States in this event.

Later, the medals for the competition were presented by IOC member Angela Ruggiero, and the gifts were presented by IAAF Council Member Stephanie Hightower.

Records
Prior to the competition, the existing World and Olympic records were as follows.

The following national records were established during the competition:

Schedule
All times are Brazil time (UTC−3)

Results

Heats
Qualification: First 3 in each heat (Q) and the next 2 fastest (q) advance to the Final

Heat 1

Heat 2

Final

References

Women's 4 x 400 metres relay
Relay foot races at the Olympics
Olympics 2016
2016 in women's athletics
Women's events at the 2016 Summer Olympics